ICOM Simulations, Inc. (later known as Rabid Entertainment) was a software company based in Wheeling, Illinois. It is best known for creating the MacVenture series of adventure games including Shadowgate.

Following the foundation in 1981 a number of game titles for the Panasonic JR-200 were produced. Later products for the Apple Macintosh included the debugger TMON and an application launching utility called OnCue.

History
ICOM Simulations was formed as TMQ Software on March 4, 1981, by Tod Zipnick.  With the MacVenture series, ICOM pioneered the point-and-click adventure interface and later multiplatform CD-ROM development with Sherlock Holmes: Consulting Detective.  Zipnick died of Hodgkin's disease in 1991 just as the company was beginning to take off.

In the early-to-mid 1990s, ICOM Simulations was a major third-party developer for the TurboGrafx-16 (TG-16) platform in the US. They produced many games for the console, including the TG-16 exclusive Shadowgate sequel, Beyond Shadowgate.

The company was acquired in 1993 by Viacom New Media which closed its operations in 1997. Renamed to Rabid Entertainment, VNM/ICOM was dismantled in 1998.

The rights to ICOM's game portfolio were held by the company Infinite Ventures, but they are now owned by David Marsh who obtained most of the rights in January 2012.  On March 5, 2012, Dave Marsh and Karl Roelofs, both former developers at ICOM Simulations, formed a new game development company called Zojoi, LLC, and have begun releasing upgraded versions of previous ICOM Simulations titles, starting with Sherlock Holmes: Consulting Detective for iOS Tablets.

Games

See also
 Zojoi

References

External links
ICOM Simulations at MobyGames

Companies based in Cook County, Illinois
Software companies established in 1980
Software companies disestablished in 1998
Defunct companies based in Illinois
Defunct software companies of the United States
Defunct video game companies of the United States
Software companies based in Illinois